Acleris perfundana is a species of moth of the family Tortricidae. It is found in Korea, China, Japan and the Russian Far East (Amur, Primorye).

The wingspan is about 17 mm.

The larvae feed on Quercus serrata, Quercus mongolica, Zelkova serrata and Zelkova schneideriana.

References

Moths described in 1962
perfundana
Moths of Asia